Mount White  may refer to:
Mount White (Antarctica)
Mount White (Colorado)
Mount White, New South Wales, Australia

See also
Mont Blanc / Monte Bianco, a peak in the Alps on the border between France and Italy